Katherine Kennicott Davis (June 25, 1892 – April 20, 1980) was an American composer, pianist, arranger, and teacher, whose most well-known composition is the Christmas song "Carol of the Drum," later known as "The Little Drummer Boy".

Life and career
Davis was born in St. Joseph, Missouri, on June 25, 1892. She composed her first piece of music, "Shadow March," at the age of 15. She graduated from St. Joseph High School in 1910, and studied music at Wellesley College in Massachusetts. In 1914 she won the college's Billings Prize. After graduation she continued at Wellesley as an assistant in the Music Department, teaching music theory and piano. At the same time she studied at the New England Conservatory of Music in Boston. Davis also studied with Nadia Boulanger in Paris. She taught music at the Concord Academy in Concord, Massachusetts, and at the Shady Hill School for Girls in Philadelphia.

She became a member of ASCAP in 1941. and was granted an honorary doctorate from Stetson University, in DeLand, Florida. Katherine K. Davis continued writing music until she became ill in the winter of 1979–1980. She died on April 20, 1980, at the age of 87, in Littleton, Massachusetts.  She left all of the royalties and proceeds from her compositions, which include operas, choruses, children's operettas, cantatas, piano and organ pieces, and songs, to Wellesley College's Music Department. These funds are used to support students studying performance.

Music
Many of her over 600 compositions were written for the choirs at her school. She was actively involved in The Concord Series, multiple-volume set of music and books for educational purposes. Many of the musical volumes were compiled, arranged, and edited by Davis with Archibald T. Davison, and they were published by E.C. Schirmer in Boston.

She wrote "The Little Drummer Boy" (originally titled "The Carol of the Drum"), in 1941. It became famous when recorded by the Harry Simeone Chorale in 1958: the recording went to the top of the Billboard charts and Simeone insisted on a writer's royalty for his arrangement of the song.

Another famous hymn by Katherine Davis is the Thanksgiving hymn "Let All Things Now Living" which uses the melody of the traditional Welsh folk song The Ash Grove.

Musical compositions

Large works
Children of Bethlehem, Christmas cantata for children's voices, 1973, Broadman Press
The Drummer, Christmas play with music for soloists, mixed chorus (SATB), organ or piano and handbells, 1966, Mills Music
This is Noel, carol cantata for SATB voice, SB solos, optional oboe, piano or organ, 1935, Remick Music
The Unmusical Impresario, musical comedy in one act, 1956, G. Schirmer
Who is Jesus?, Easter cantata for children's voices, 1974, Broadman Press

Sacred songs for voice and piano or organ
Be Ye Kind, One to Another (Ephesians 4: 32, 31), 1948, Galaxy Music
Bless the Lord O My Soul (Psalm 103), 1952, Galaxy Music
Dear Lord and Father, R. D. Row/Carl Fischer
How Lovely Are Thy Dwellings (Psalm 84 : 1–3), 1952, Galaxy Music
Raising of Lazarus (John XI: 1,3,4,17,41,42,43,44,25), 1957, Carl Fischer
Thou Wilt Hear our Prayer, R. D. Row/Carl Fischer
Treasure in Heaven, R. D. Row/Carl Fisher
Trust in the Lord (Proverbs 3: 5–6), 1946, Galaxy Music

Secular songs for voice and piano
Folk Song Settings, arrangements and English texts by Katherine K. Davis, Galaxy Music
The Deaf Old Woman (Missouri Folk Song), 1947
He's Gone Away (North Carolina Folk Song), 1947
The Soldier (Kentucky Folk Song), 1947
Bagpipes (Hungarian Folk Tune), 1949
The Mill Wheel (J'entends le moulin, French Canadian Folk Song), 1949
The Pitcher (Portuguese Folk Song), 1951
I Have a Fawn (Thomas Moore), 1966, Galaxy Music
Nancy Hanks (Rosemary Benét), a work about Nancy Lincoln, 1941, Galaxy Music

Original choral works
Alleluia, come, good people, text by John Crowley, mixed voices a cappella, 1941, Galaxy Music
The Birds' Noël (Christmas carol), mixed voices and keyboard, 1965, Galliard/Galaxy Music
In the Bleak Midwinter, text by Christina Rossetti, SSA a cappella, 1933, E.C. Schirmer
The Little Drummer Boy (with Harry Simeone and Henry Onorati), SA or SATB chorus and keyboard, 1958, Shawnee Press
Our God is a Rock, mixed voices and keyboard, 1949, C.C. Birchard
Seasonal Anthems for junior choirs (7 original works and 3 arrangements), two-part children's chorus and keyboard, 1963, B.F. Wood Music
Shepherds, Awake!, mixed voices a cappella, 1938, Remick Music
Sing Gloria, text by John Crowley, mixed voices, SA duet, and keyboard, 1952, Remick Music

Original instrumental works
Hornpipe, piano solo, 1956, J. Fischer and Bros.

The Concord Series
The Concord piano books, 4 volumes, 1925–1927, Nos. 600–602, 604
Cinderella, a folk-tune operetta in three acts without spoken dialogue, 1933, No. 616
Songs of freedom, for unison and part singing (with Archibald T. Davison and Frederic W. Kempf), 1942, No. 621

Arrangements of other composers' works
Bois épais (aria from Amadis by Jean-Baptiste Lully), voice and piano, 1956, Galaxy Music
Choruses (with Channing Lefebre) in For us a child is born (Uns ist ein Kind geboren) (Johann Kuhnau, attr. J.S. Bach), cantata for SSA voices, SA solo, and keyboard, 1951, Galaxy Music
God is Life (Gott lebet noch by J.S. Bach), voice and piano or organ, 1955, Galaxy Music
Sheep may safely graze (J.S. Bach), mixed voices and piano, 1942, Galliard/Galaxy Music

Other editions and arrangements
As it fell upon a night (traditional Christmas carol), mixed voices, soprano descant, and piano, 1942, Galaxy Music
Awake, Thou Wintry Earth (17th-century Dutch carol, text by Thomas Blackburn), 1936, E.C. Schirmer
The Belfry book, for unison and two-part singing, 1943, Remick Music
The Belfry book of Christmas carols, SSA a cappella, 1958, Remick Music
The Bow Street book, folksongs and part-songs for soprano, alto, and baritone, 1951, Birchard Music
Carol of the Drum, Czech carol, SATB chorus, 1941, B.F. Wood Music Company
Early American anthem book, anthem tunes and verses from the Colonial period in new settings, 1975, Galaxy Music
Four Elizabethan madrigals, for string quartet or instrumental ensemble, ed. with Hazel Weems, 1962, G. Schirmer
The Galaxy junior chorus book, two-part folksongs, 1945, Galaxy Music
The Green Hill, junior choir and duet book (soprano and alto), 1938, E.C. Schirmer
The Green Hill, three-part sacred music for women's voices (S.S.A.), 1940, E.C. Schirmer
Let all mortal flesh keep silence (French carol), SAB chorus and piano, 1941, B.F. Wood Music
Let All Things Now Living, Welsh carol, text by John Crowley, SATB chorus with descant, 1939, E.C. Schirmer
O God, our help in ages past (St. Anne hymn tune, text by Isaac Watts), mixed voices and keyboard, 1941, Boston Music
Prayer of Thanksgiving (Netherlands folk song), mixed voices a cappella, 1936, E.C. Schirmer
Sing Unto the Lord, twenty sacred solos for medium voice and piano or organ, with Nancy Loring, 1948, Carl Fisher
Thou who wast God (hymn from the Genevan psalter), SSA and keyboard, 1960, Galaxy Music

Footnotes

References

Further reading

.
.

1892 births
1980 deaths
20th-century American composers
20th-century American women musicians
20th-century classical composers
American classical composers
American women classical composers
People from St. Joseph, Missouri
Wellesley College alumni
20th-century women composers
American women hymnwriters